The Capo Sandalo Lighthouse is prominent lighthouse on the westernmost point of San Pietro Island marking the southwestern corner of Sardinia, Italy.

Description
The original stone tower was built in 1864. It is an active aid to marine and aeronautical navigation. To this day, the lighthouse remains a beautiful structure of unpainted stone, with a gray metallic lantern dome. The lighthouse is now automated, and a keeper lived on premises until recently. Chart references: ARLHS SAR-018; Admiralty E1090; NGA 8432. French charts 7332. The lighthouse is connected by a well paved road to the main town of Carloforte on San Pietro Island.

See also
 List of lighthouses in Italy
 San Pietro Island

References

External links

 Capo Sandalo Lighthouse cyberlights.com
 Servizio Fari Marina Militare 

Lighthouses completed in 1864
Lighthouses in Italy
Buildings and structures in Sardinia